Garnieria is a genus of air-breathing land snails, terrestrial pulmonate gastropod mollusks in the tribe Garnieriini  of the subfamily Garnieriinae in the family Clausiliidae, the door snails.

Species
 Garnieria huleschhelii Grego & Szekeres, 2011
 Garnieria mouhoti (L. Pfeiffer, 1863)
 Garnieria nhuongi Do, 2015
 Garnieria saurini H. Nordsieck, 2002

References

 Nordsieck, H. (2012). Note on Garnieriini (Gastropoda, Stylommatophora, Clausiliidae, Garnieriinae). Acta Conchyliorum, 12: 57–62, 1 pl.
 Páll-Gergely B. & Szekeres M. (2017). New and little known Clausiliidae (Gastropoda: Pulmonata) from Laos and southern Vietnam. Journal of Conchology. 42(6): 507–521.

External links
 Bourguignat, J.R. (1877). Histoire des clausilies de France vivantes et fossiles. Annales des Sciences Naturelles, Zoologie et Paléontologie. ser. 6, 5(4): 1-50

Clausiliidae